Ibrahim Amin Baldar (1920–1998) (Kurdish: ئیبراهیم ئه‌مین باڵدار) was born in 1920 in the city of Sulaymaniyah. He is the author to the first official Kurdish language primer Alfubei Nwe published in 1951.

References 

1920 births
1998 deaths
Kurdish language
Kurdish male writers
Iraqi writers